Protoneura cara, the orange-striped threadtail, is a species of narrow-winged damselfly in the family Protoneuridae, superfamily Coenagrionoidea. It is found in Central America and North America.

The IUCN conservation status of Protoneura cara is "LC", least concern, with no immediate threat to the species' survival. The population is stable. The IUCN status was reviewed in 2017.

References

Further reading

 

Protoneuridae
Articles created by Qbugbot
Insects described in 1903